Don Reese (born December 7, 1953) is an American professional golfer.

Reese was born in Oconto Falls, Wisconsin. He played college golf at Troy State University where he was an All-American. He turned professional in 1979.

Reese played on the PGA Tour, Nationwide Tour, and Champions Tour while also working as a club professional. On the PGA Tour (1982, 1989–90, 1994–95), his best finish was T-5 at the 1989 Hawaiian Open. On the Nationwide Tour (1990–94, 1997-2002), he won once at the 1991 Ben Hogan Lake City Classic. On the Champions Tour (2005), his best finish was a pair of T-10s at the 2005 Turtle Bay Championship and the 2005 SBC Classic.

Professional wins (4)

Ben Hogan Tour wins (1)

Other wins (3)
1983 Long Island Open
1985 Metropolitan PGA Championship
1986 Metropolitan PGA Championship

Results in major championships

CUT = missed the halfway cut
Note: Reese only played in the U.S. Open.

See also
1988 PGA Tour Qualifying School graduates
1993 PGA Tour Qualifying School graduates
1994 PGA Tour Qualifying School graduates

References

External links

American male golfers
PGA Tour golfers
Golfers from Wisconsin
Golfers from Florida
Troy University alumni
People from Oconto Falls, Wisconsin
People from Walton County, Florida
1953 births
Living people